Massanzago is a comune (municipality) in the Province of Padua in the Italian region Veneto, located about  northwest of Venice and about  northeast of Padua.

Massanzago borders the following municipalities: Borgoricco, Camposampiero, Noale, Santa Maria di Sala, Trebaseleghe.

Demographic evolution

References

External links
 www.comune.massanzago.pd.it/

Cities and towns in Veneto